The Nerul–Uran line which is also known as Port line of the Mumbai Suburban Railway is a railway line serving between CBD Belapur and Nerul in Navi Mumbai with Uran in Navi Mumbai of India, which is attached to the Harbour line. It was inaugurated on 11 November 2018. Daily services started on 12 November 2018.

This railway line will help to accelerate the growth of Navi Mumbai, Jawaharlal Nehru Port, and the Newly developed areas of Mumbai And also will cater to the passenger traffic demands generated by Jawaharlal Nehru Port, port-based industries, ONGC, the Defence establishment and other residential, industrial, and warehousing complexes in Uran.

Technical specifications
The total length of the corridor is 27 km and consists of 10 stations; 4 major bridges; 5 roads over bridges, 15 roads under bridges, 1 track under bridge. The 270 mt platforms for two Broad gauge (BG) tracks to cater 12-car electric multiple unit rakes with double discharge.  The railway track structure shall comprise 60 kg/m I-class rails laid on monoblock prestressed concrete sleepers to 16660/Km sleeper density. The bridges will be built to the Modified Broad gauge (MBG) standard of loading. Stone ballast 65mm gauge with ballast cushion of 300mm below the underside of sleepers will be provided and also provisions are made for one arm of the railway line to go to CBD Belapur.

In this railway line project, it divided into two phases :
 The Phase I starts from Nerul and CBD Belapur to Kharkopar with stations are Seawoods, Sagar Sangam, Targhar, Bamandongari and Kharkopar.
 Whereas, Phase II starts from Kharkopar to Uran with stations are Gavhan, Ranjanpada, Nhava-Sheva and Dronagiri.

Status
 In Phase-I, Bamandongari and Kharkopar are fully operational and Targhar station is still under construction. But the construction of Sagar Sangam railway station is temporarily postponed due to completing the railway line within the time limit of October 2018 till the later phase.

 In Phase-II, the Construction of all stations lying between Kharkopar and Uran is currently going on.

History
The City and Industrial Development Corporation of Maharashtra (CIDCO) was appointed as a New Town Development Authority in 1970. The government acquired land from 95 villages and handed it over to CIDCO for the development of towns. To decongest the mother city, Mumbai, CIDCO developed 14 nodes in Navi Mumbai. The development of Navi Mumbai International Airport and 6 railway corridors in Navi Mumbai were meant for increasing connectivity between the towns, nodes and mega establishments. The major features of the rail corridor are direct access from residential to railway station by foot, convenient interchange facility from one corridor to another, double discharge platforms at every station, easy to follow routes and comfortable and pleasant journeys from the key features of the commuter railway system in Navi Mumbai.

For that purpose, The railway Project between Nerul and Belapur- Seawood-Uran was approved by Ministry of Railways and the CIDCO Board. The work on the project began in July 1997. However, due to various unforeseen reasons, the work was delayed and hence stalled, until recently when the project was revived after the tripartite agreement between Railways, CIDCO and Govt. of Maharashtra was executed on 29 July 2011.

The original estimate cost for the project was 495 crore in 1997, which escalated to 1,782 crore. The cost is being shared by CIDCO and the Indian Railways (67:33).

Construction of Phase-I on this route was begun in the first week of March 2017. After completion of Phase-I, it was commissioned by CRS on the 1st November 2018 and after, was inaugurated on 11 November 2018 through video conferencing by Railway Minister Piyush Goyal and Chief Minister of Maharashtra Devendra Fadnavis. First more than 3000 tickets were sold, with earnings of  during inauguration day of Phase-I.

Stations

See also
 Mumbai Suburban Railway
 List of Mumbai Suburban Railway stations
 CST–Panvel fast corridor
 Central Railway

References

External links
Harbour line timetable (July 2010)
All about Travelling in Mumbai, including Harbour Railway, Local Train Timetable
HARBOUR Railway local Train Timetable

Rail transport in Mumbai
Transport in Navi Mumbai
Mumbai Suburban Railway lines
2018 establishments in Maharashtra
Railway lines opened in 2018